Shafter is an unincorporated community in Fayette County, Illinois, United States.

Notable person
Arthur Roe, Illinois legislator and lawyer, was born in Shafter.

Notes

Unincorporated communities in Fayette County, Illinois
Unincorporated communities in Illinois